Raj Deepak Shetty (born 18 October 1978) is an Indian actor, predominantly working in Kannada and Telugu film industry.

Early life

Deepak Shetty was born to Prem Shetty and Sarala Shetty in Mangalore, Karnataka. Deepak finished his schooling at Milagres Pre University and graduated from St. Aloysius, Mangalore. Deepak's interest in acting started at an early age when he was taking part in school and college plays.

Personal life

On 18 October 2020 Raj Deepak Shetty married Sonia Rodrigues.

Career

Raj Deepak Shetty started his acting career through working in Kannada serials. He has worked in Kadambari, Preethi Illada Mele, Nigooda, Bande Baruthava Kaala, Muthina Thene, Luv Lavike, Niharika and other serials.

Director Chethan Kumar cast him as antagonist opposite to actor Dhruva Sarja in the film Bharjari which was released in the year 2017. After which Deepak played an antagonist role in the movies Tiger and Srikanta, directed by Nanda Kishore and Manju Swaraj respectively. Srikanta was his first film release followed by Tiger and Bharjari.

His role as Devendra Viswanath in iSmart Shankar released in 2019 as an antagonist introduced him to the Telugu film industry. Playing the lead as Pratap Reddy in his debut web series, Gods of Dharmapuri directed by Anish Kuruvilla is fetching him many roles in Telugu Film Industry. Deepak will be seen in upcoming Telugu film Hanu Man directed by Prashanth Varma. Deepak will be acting in upcoming Telugu film Hanu Man, directed by Prasanth Varma.

Filmography

Television

Films

Web series

Awards and nominations

Footnotes

References

External links
 

Living people
1978 births
Kannada male actors
Male actors in Telugu cinema
Male actors in Kannada cinema
Male actors from Mangalore
Indian male film actors